Arizona Roundup is a 1942 American Western film produced and directed by Robert Emmett Tansey who co-wrote the film with Frances Kavanaugh. The film stars Tom Keene, Frank Yaconelli, Sugar Dawn, Jack Ingram, Hope Blackwood in her only film and Steve Clark. The film was released on March 6, 1942, by Monogram Pictures.

Plot
Tom Kenyon (Tom Keene) and his sidekick Pierre La Farge (Frank Yaconelli) are hired by rancher Mike O'Day and his daughter Sugar (Sugar Dawn) to deliver wild horses to the government's remount station. Ed Spencer and Ted Greenway form a combine that they plan to use to charge an exorbitant price to O'Day to get the horses shipped. Tom then discloses that he is a government agent and has a plan to beat their villainous scheme.

Cast          
Tom Keene as Tom Kenyon
Frank Yaconelli as Pierre La Fair
Sugar Dawn as Sugar O'Day
Jack Ingram as Duke Carlton
Hope Blackwood as Toni O'Day
Steve Clark as Mike O'Day
Tom Seidel as Hank Waters 
Nick Moro as Pancake 
Hal Price as Ted Greenway
I. Stanford Jolley as Ed Spincer
Fred Hoose as Mr. Holms
James Sheridan as Kansas 
Gene Alsace as Rocky 
Steven Clensos as Buck

References

External links
 

1942 films
1940s English-language films
American Western (genre) films
1942 Western (genre) films
Monogram Pictures films
Films directed by Robert Emmett Tansey
American black-and-white films
1940s American films